The Rabbit River is an  tributary of the Mississippi River in northern Minnesota, United States.  It rises at the outlet of Rabbit Lake, north of Crosby, and flows southwest through a chain of lakes past Ironton, joining the Mississippi River at the outlet of Little Rabbit Lake northwest of Riverton.

See also
List of rivers of Minnesota

References

External links
Minnesota Watersheds
USGS Hydrologic Unit Map - State of Minnesota (1974)

Rivers of Minnesota
Tributaries of the Mississippi River
Rivers of Crow Wing County, Minnesota